Sunita Puri is a former captain of the Indian Women's Hockey Team. In 1966 she received the Arjuna Award from Government of India for excellence in sports. She is from Delhi state. She was from I.P. College, New Delhi where she participated in various track and field events also viz. Javelin throw, Discus throw, Shot Put other than playing Hockey. She joined Indian Railways and captained the Indian Railway Women Hockey team. She has played hockey with the Indian and World Hockey Legend..Shri Dhyanchand Ji. Sunita Puri was married to Shri Yatish Chandra (Mehrishi), Ex. Army (1st 11 Gurkha Rifles) who later joined Indian Police Service (IPS - 68 batch) and was an officer in the Madhya Pradesh cadre. He retired from the rank of Director General in the year 2000.
Sunita Puri Chandra was also in the "Vikram Award" committee of the Madhya Pradesh Government. 
She left for her heavenly abode in January 2020.

References 
 Different Strokes

Field hockey players from Rajasthan
Living people
Indian female field hockey players
Recipients of the Arjuna Award
Sportswomen from Rajasthan
20th-century Indian women
20th-century Indian people
Year of birth missing (living people)